The Hanriot HD.3 C.2 was a two-seat fighter aircraft produced in France during World War I.

Design and development
Similar in appearance to a scaled-up HD.1, the Hanriot HD.3 was a conventional, single-bay biplane with staggered wings of equal span. The pilot and gunner sat in tandem, open cockpits and the main units of the fixed tailskid undercarriage were linked by a cross-axle. Short struts braced the fuselage sides to the lower wing.

Operational history

Flight testing revealed excellent performance, and the French government ordered 300 of the type in 1918, in preparation for a major offensive the following year. When the war ended, the contract was cancelled with around 75 aircraft having been delivered to the Aéronautique Militaire and at least 15 to the Aéronautique Maritime. One example was delivered to the Aéronautique Maritime in summer 1918 equipped with twin float undercarriage and a larger tailfin; it was intended that this would be the prototype of a dedicated floatplane fighter designated HD.4, but the war ended before any further development took place. The Armistice also led to the abandonment of a dedicated night fighter variant, the HD.3bis, with enlarged and balanced ailerons  and rudder and with a wing of increased section.

After the war, one of the navy's machines was used for trials aboard the new aircraft carrier Béarn, while another was used for floatation tests at the Isle of Grain.

Variants
 HD.3 C.2 
Main production version
 HD.3bis CN.2
Nightfighter prototype with thick wing section and revised control surfaces (1 built)
 HD.4
Floatplane derivative of HD.3. One built.
HD.9 Ap.1
Single-seat photo-reconnaissance biplane, powered by a  Salmson 9Za water-cooled radial piston engine. Ten evaluation aircraft were ordered, with the first completed in November 1918.

Operators

French Navy

Aeronautica Militare

Specifications (HD.3 C.2)

References

Notes

Bibliography

 Bruce, J.M. War Planes of the First World War: Volume Five, Fighters. London: Macdonald, 1972. .
 Taylor, John W. R. and Jean Alexander. Combat Aircraft of the World. New York: G.P. Putnam's Sons, 1969. .  
 Taylor, Michael J. H. Jane's Encyclopedia of Aviation. London: Studio Editions, 1989. . 
 World Aircraft Information Files. London: Bright Star Publishing, File 896 Sheet 11.

1910s French fighter aircraft
Hanriot aircraft
Aircraft first flown in 1917